Kelly Clark (born July 26, 1983) is an American snowboarder who won halfpipe gold at the 2002 Winter Olympics. Clark was born in Newport, Rhode Island. She started snowboarding when she was 7 years old, began competing in 1999, and became a member of the US Snowboard team in 2000. On January 25, 2019, at the Winter X Games in Aspen, she announced her retirement from the sport.

Biography
Clark trained for competitive snowboarding at Mount Snow Academy in Vermont and graduated in spring 2001. She won a gold medal for women's halfpipe at the 2002 Winter Olympics and competed in the halfpipe event again in the 2006 Winter Olympics. She ended up placing fourth behind fellow Americans Hannah Teter and Gretchen Bleiler, as well as Norwegian Kjersti Buaas. In the 2010 Vancouver Olympics Kelly won a bronze medal in the halfpipe after placing third behind American silver medalist Teter and Australian Torah Bright.

In the TTR World Tour 2007/2008 season, she recorded eight podium finishes out of 12 contest entries, with five of those as TTR Titles including the 6Star Burton European Open, the 5Star Chevrolet Grand Prix and the 6Star season-ending Roxy Chicken Jam US.
In the 2008/2009 World Tour she finished the season as Swatch TTR World Snowboard Tour Champion.

Clark is based in Mammoth Lakes, California.

Clark is a Christian. She rides with a sticker on her snowboard proclaiming, "Jesus, I cannot hide my love." She discusses her faith and
lessons from her life as a professional snowboarder in her 2017 memoir Inspired.

Awards and honors
In 2015, Clark received the Best Female Action Sports Athlete ESPY Award.

Competition history
Highlights of Swatch TTR 2009/2010 Season
 1st – Halfpipe – 5Star Burton New Zealand Open (Ticket to Ride (World Snowboard Tour))
 1st – Halfpipe – 6Star Burton US Open (Ticket to Ride (World Snowboard Tour))
 1st – Halfpipe – 6Star Roxy Chicken Jam US (Ticket to Ride (World Snowboard Tour))

Highlights of Swatch TTR 2008/2009 Season
Swatch TTR World Snowboard Tour Champion 2008/09
 3rd – Halfpipe – 5Star Burton New Zealand Open (Ticket to Ride (World Snowboard Tour))
 1st – Halfpipe – 6Star Burton European Open (Ticket to Ride (World Snowboard Tour))
 1st – Halfpipe – 5Star Nissan X-Trail Asian Open (Ticket to Ride (World Snowboard Tour))
 2nd – Halfpipe – 6Star Burton US Open (Ticket to Ride (World Snowboard Tour))
 1st – Halfpipe – 6Star Roxy Chicken Jam (Ticket to Ride (World Snowboard Tour))

Victories on the Swatch TTR World Snowboard Tour (status: July 2010)

Career highlights

 2010 Winter X Games – Superpipe – 1st place
 2009 Winter Dew Tour – Dew Cup – 1st place
 2008 Chevy Grand Prix – Tamarack – Halfpipe – 1st place
 2008 Winter X Games – Halfpipe – 2nd place
 2007 New Zealand Open – Quarterpipe – 1st place
 2007 New Zealand Open – Halfpipe – 2nd place
 2007 Burton Abominable Snow Jam – Overall – 2nd place
 2007 Burton Abominable Snow Jam – Halfpipe – 2nd place
 2006 US Grand Prix – Halfpipe – 1st pace
 2006 Burton New Zealand Open – Quarterpipe – 1st place
 2006 Burton New Zealand Open – Superpipe – 1st place
 2006 Chevrolet Grand Prix – Halfpipe – 2nd place
 2005 FIS World Cup – Halfpipe – 1st place
 2005 Grand Prix #3- Halfpipe – 2nd place

See also 
 List of athletes with the most appearances at Olympic Games
 Mount Snow

References

 McGlinchey, Thomas D. "Olympic journeys". WORLD magazine. February 13, 2010. p. 57.
 Kellys Official Swatch TTR Profile
 https://www.teamusa.org/us-ski-and-snowboard/athletes/Kelly-Clark

External links

 
 
 
 
 
 Kelly Clark on Go211.com Kelly's blog, photos and videos.
 NBC Sports Profile
 Kelly's U.S. Olympic Team bio 
 Onboard magazine interview with Kelly Clark
 Shred Betties Magazine interview with Kelly Clark 
 EXPN Athlete Bio

 Mount Snow Athlete Bio

1983 births
Living people
People from Dover, Vermont
Sportspeople from Vermont
American female snowboarders
American Christians
Snowboarders at the 2002 Winter Olympics
Snowboarders at the 2006 Winter Olympics
Snowboarders at the 2010 Winter Olympics
Snowboarders at the 2014 Winter Olympics
Snowboarders at the 2018 Winter Olympics
Olympic Games broadcasters
Olympic gold medalists for the United States in snowboarding
Olympic bronze medalists for the United States in snowboarding
X Games athletes
Medalists at the 2014 Winter Olympics
Medalists at the 2010 Winter Olympics
Medalists at the 2002 Winter Olympics
People from Mammoth Lakes, California
21st-century American women